Siwanoy Country Club is a country club located in Bronxville, New York. The club hosted the first PGA Championship in 1916, which was won by Jim Barnes.

History
The Club was incorporated on May 20, 1901 at the Westchester County Clerk's office. The officers were president, Archibald M. Campbell; vice-president, Frank Mack vice-president; secretary, William N. G. Clarke; Arthur D. Stone, treasurer; and Alfred E. Taylor, team captain. The club got its name from the tribe that inhabited the shore of Long Island Sound. The club leased the Robert O. Glover estate with 40 acres of land and a house and barn. A 18 hole golf course and tennis courts were developed.

Tom Kerrigan joined the Siwanoy Country Club in 1914 and served as professional at the Club for a half century. In 1939 he shot the exceptionally low score of 62 on the par 71 Siwanoy course. He was often called "Tee Shot" Kerrigan due to his ability to hit unusually long drives. He is one of just a few who were granted lifetime honorary membership at the Club. The World War I fighter ace Eddie Rickenbacker also received that honor.

References

External links 

Bronxville, New York
Golf clubs and courses in New York (state)
Golf clubs and courses designed by Donald Ross
Sports venues in Westchester County, New York
1901 establishments in New York (state)